Anna Akhsharumova (born 9 January 1957, Moscow) is a Woman Grandmaster of chess. She is married to chess grandmaster Boris Gulko.

Akhsharumova and her husband became famous in the late-1970s as Soviet Refuseniks. They were finally allowed to leave the Soviet Union and immigrate to the United States in 1986. 
She won the Women's Soviet Chess Championship in 1976 and 1984.
She won the 1987 U.S. Women's Chess Championship, with a perfect score.

She played for the U.S. in the Women's Chess Olympiads of 1988, 1990 and 1996.

Her best Elo rating was 2400 in 1989.

References

External links
 
 
 
 

1957 births
Living people
Chess woman grandmasters
American female chess players
Russian female chess players
Soviet female chess players
Refuseniks
21st-century American women